The Battle of Ossa, one of many clashes of the January Uprising, took place on July 10, 1863, near the village of Ossa, which at that time belonged to Russian-controlled Congress Poland. An insurgent unit under Ludwik Żychliński clashed with a detachment of the Imperial Russian Army.

Polish forces numbered well over 1,000 men (200 zouaves, 300 riflemen, 600 kosynierzy and additional 200 insurgents who lacked any weapons). They camped at Ossa, and began their military exercises, when on July 10, 1863 at 6 p.m., were attacked by the Russians. The attack was fought off by the zouaves, who, with support of the kosynierzy, managed to break Russian positions. The Russians retreated towards Nowe Miasto nad Pilicą, leaving behind 28 bodies. Polish losses were 4 dead and 16 wounded.

References

Sources 
 Stefan Kieniewicz: Powstanie styczniowe. Warszawa: Państwowe Wydawnictwo Naukowe, 1983. .

Ossa
1863 in Poland
Ossa
July 1863 events